This is a listing of players to have played both Australian rules football in the nation's premier leagues and first-class cricket or higher. These leagues are the Australian Football League (AFL), formerly the VFL, West Australian Football League (WAFL) and South Australian National Football League (SANFL). First-class cricketers who played football in other states are eligible if they had a notable career in that state's top league.

In the early years of the VFL it was quite common for footballers to play district cricket over the summer months, some of them even made their state sides and others represented Australia. Likewise cricketers would often play football in the off season to keep fit and if good enough would appear in their state's best league.

Players are divided into the lists below by which state they spent the majority of their sporting career or in come cases their state or origin.

International cricketers who played interstate football

International cricketers who played league football

State cricketers who played interstate football

Queensland

South Australia

Tasmania

Victoria

Western Australia

First-class cricketers who played league football

South Australia

Tasmania

Victoria

Western Australia

References
 (section titled "On Famous Footballing Cricketers" based on work by Jim Phelan)

Cricket
Football
Cricket